Malsis School located at a mansion known as Malsis Hall in the village of Crosshills, in North Yorkshire, England,  was a co-educational independent pre-prep and preparatory school for pupils aged 3 to 13 years. The school was founded in 1920, and closed due to falling pupil numbers in 2014.
Facilities at the school included a 3 km mountain bike trail, 9-hole golf course, swimming pool, all weather pitch, rifle range, 40 acres of grounds and a Chapel with windows by the renowned stained-glass artist John Piper.

The school closed on 10 December 2014, when the final assembly started at 11 am and concluded at 1 pm. The next day the school trust went into administration with Ernst & Young of Leeds. The school's assets were auctioned off and the land and building sold by Eddisons, and having fully paid off its debts it passed into creditors voluntary liquidation and the company was finally dissolved on 4 August 2017 according to Companies House.

In January 2015, The Old Malsis Association (OMA) was formed to represent the views of school alumni from down the years.

References

External links
 School web site. Retrieved 26 December 2011
 "The Manor of Malsis", Millenniumschools.co.uk. Retrieved 7 June 2013
 :Category:People educated at Malsis School

Defunct schools in North Yorkshire
Educational institutions established in 1920
1920 establishments in England
Educational institutions disestablished in 2014
2014 disestablishments in England